The one hundred pound coin (£100) is a commemorative denomination of sterling coinage. Issued for the first time by the Royal Mint in 2015 and sold at face value, £100 coins hold legal tender status but are intended as collectors' items and are not found in general circulation. , the silver content of each coin (in bullion quantities) was worth about £35.

Design
The designs which have appeared on the £100 coin's reverse are summarised in the table below.

Elizabeth Tower (Big Ben)

The first minting of a new commemorative coin denominated £100 was announced on 29 December 2014. The first mintage of this denomination totalled 50,000 coins.

The 2015 issue features the Ian Rank-Broadley portrait of Queen Elizabeth II on the obverse and an image of Elizabeth Tower, often called Big Ben after the bell it houses, on the reverse.

Buckingham Palace
In early August 2015, the Royal Mint announced a second £100 coin would be minted.

This second issue features an image of Buckingham Palace by Glyn Davies and Laura Clancy on the reverse, while on the obverse is a portrait of Queen Elizabeth II by Jody Clark, making it the first face-value coin to feature that portrait.

Trafalgar Square
In 2016, the Royal Mint announced a third £100 coin would be minted, featuring Trafalgar Square.

Legal tender status
The prolific issuance since 2013 of silver commemorative £20, £50 and £100 coins at face value has led to attempts to spend or deposit these coins,
prompting the Royal Mint to clarify the legal tender status of these coins.
Royal Mint guidelines advise that, although the coins were approved as legal tender, they are considered limited edition collectables not intended for general circulation, and hence shops and banks are not obliged to accept them.

See also

Coins of the pound sterling
Twenty pounds (British coin)

References

2015 establishments in the United Kingdom
Coins of the United Kingdom
One-hundred-base-unit coins
Products introduced in 2015
Silver coins